The 2006 Hull City Council election took place on 4 May 2006 to elect members of Hull City Council in England. One third of the council was up for election and the council stayed under no overall control. Overall turnout was 27.3%.

Before the election in April 2006 the national Labour government removed their "statutory direction" of the council which had been put in place in 2003 after inspectors criticised the performance of the council. The council was now described as having made adequate progress, but the opposition Liberal Democrats criticised the timing of the announcement during the campaign for the local elections.

The results saw the Liberal Democrats become the largest party on the council after gaining 4 seats including defeating the Labour Lord Mayor, Bryan Bradley. However immediately after the election they were not confident they would be able to get enough support from other parties to take control from Labour. Following the election the 2 Liberal and 3 of the various independent councillors met with the Labour leader of the council to discuss supporting them as they preferred Labour to the Liberal Democrats. However it was reported that regional Labour party officials told the party to go into opposition raising the possibility that neither party would form the administration.

At the council meeting on 18 May the Liberal Democrats managed to get elected into power by one vote after receiving the support of 4 councillors from other groups, including the former Labour leader of the council Colin Inglis. He had promised to oppose Labour forming the administration if 2 of the councillors who had been involved in removing him as leader were part of any Labour cabinet.

After the election, the composition of the council was
Liberal Democrat 26
Labour 25
Conservative 2
Hull Independents 2
Independent 2
Liberal Party 2

Election result

Ward results

No elections were held in Beverley, Kings Park and Newland wards.

References

2006
2006 English local elections
2000s in Kingston upon Hull